Hippocrepis emerus, the  scorpion senna, is a species of perennial plant belonging to the genus Hippocrepis in the family Fabaceae.

Description
The plant has a lignified stem with green branches bearing five to nine leaflets. These leaves are glossy, obovate, and imparipinnate, with their maximum width being above the middle and often larger extremities. The petals are "nailed", meaning they have a long handle ("nail") and a "plate". The nails of the petals are two to three times longer than the calyx. These plants are hermaphroditic and entomophilous, and their flowering period extends from April through July.

Distribution
This plant occurs in northeastern Spain and in central Mediterranean countries up to northern Europe and to Asia Minor and Tunisia.

Habitat
These shrubs are usually found in wooded and bushy areas, on sunny, warm and dry slopes and around forest edges.

Food source 
H. emerus is one of the main host plants of the moth Zygaena ephialtes.

Gallery

References

 Pignatti S. - Flora d'Italia - Edagricole – 1982. vol. III
 Tutin, T. G., eds. 1964 -1980 - Flora europaea

External links
 Biolib
 Hippocrepis

emerus
Flora of Italy
Flora of Malta